"Secrets of the Heart" is the third single by British singer and actor Chesney Hawkes. Written by Nik Kershaw, it was included in the film Buddy's Song, with Hawkes as Buddy and Roger Daltrey (of rock band the Who) as his father. The B-side is a cover of "One World", written and originally recorded by Nik Kershaw from his 1989 album The Works. Released on 16 September 1991, "Secrets of the Heart" peaked at No. 37 on the UK Singles Chart.

Track listing

Charts

References

External links
 

1991 singles
1991 songs
Chesney Hawkes songs
Chrysalis Records singles
Songs written by Chesney Hawkes